The Cabinet of Halldór Ásgrímsson in Iceland was formed 15 September 2004.

Cabinets

Inaugural cabinet: 15 September 2004 – 27 September 2005

First reshuffle: 27 September 2005 – 7 March 2006
Árni Mathiesen replaced Geir Haarde as Minister of Finance. Einar Kristinn Guðfinnsson replaced Árni Mathiesen as Minister of Fisheries. Geir Haarde replaced Davíð Oddsson as Minister for Foreign Affairs. Halldór Ásgrímsson replaced Davíð Oddsson as Minister of Statistics Iceland.

Second reshuffle: 7 March 2006 – 15 June 2006
Jón Halldór Kristjánsson replaced Árni Magnússon as Minister of Social Affairs. Siv Friðleifsdóttir replaced Jón Halldór Kristjánsson as Minister of Health and Social Security.

See also
Government of Iceland
Cabinet of Iceland

References

Halldor Asgrimsson, Cabinet of
Halldor Asgrimsson, Cabinet of
Halldor Asgrimsson, Cabinet of
Cabinets established in 2004
Cabinets disestablished in 2006
Independence Party (Iceland)
Progressive Party (Iceland)